Captain Ajay Singh Yadav is an Indian National Congress politician from the state of Haryana, India.   he was the Minister of Power, Forests and Environment and was formerly minister of Irrigation, Revenue and Elections for that state. Currently, he is the National Chairman of O.B.C. department of the A.I.C.C.

Early life
Ajay Singh Yadav was born on 2 November 1958 in a Yadav family at Saharanwas village, Rewari district, Haryana. His father was Rao Abhey Singh, who had also been a Member of the Legislative Assembly in Haryana. He was educated at various places including Jaipur, Chandigarh, New Delhi and Rewari, graduating with the degrees of BSc and LL.B. Singh became second lieutenant in the Indian Army on 7 June 1980, and resigned seven years later on 26 June 1987 as captain. After his military service, Singh pursued a political career in Rewari district.

Political career
Singh was a Member of the Legislative Assembly in Haryana for six consecutive terms, totalling 25 years.

He held the following offices:
 Member, A.I.C.C.
 Member, P.C.C.
 Deputy Leader Congress Legislative Party
 President D.C.C., Rewari
 Secretary, Haryana State Kisan Congress
 Minister for Jails, for Printing & Stationery, for Social Welfare and Women as well as for Child Development
 Officiated C.L.P. Leader in Haryana
 Deputy Leader C.L.P. in Haryana
 AICC State Observer for Rajasthan, Himachal Pradesh and Madhya Pradesh during Assembly and Lok Sabha elections.
 Finance, Irrigation & PWD Minister.
 National Chairman, A.I.C.C. O.B.C. (present)

He has been a Member of Legislative Assembly.
On 29 July 2014, Singh resigned from his post and submitted his resignation letter to Bhupinder Singh Hooda. However, Singh has not resigned from the party.

Legal issues
Yadav and his sister, Justice Nirmal Yadav of Punjab and Haryana High Court, were accused of influencing a land deal in Solan, Himachal Pradesh in 2008 by putting undue pressure on Panchkula Tehsildar Satish Kumar to issue residence certificate without proper documents. Official inquiries supported claims of impropriety, which Yadav denied.

References

People from Rewari district
Indian National Congress politicians
1958 births
Living people
Indian Army personnel
State cabinet ministers of Haryana
Haryana MLAs 2009–2014